The Men's team pursuit competition at the 2020 UCI Track Cycling World Championships was held on 26 and 27 February 2020.

Results

Qualifying
The qualifying was started on 26 February at 14:21. The eight fastest teams advanced to the first round.

First round
The first round was started on 26 February at 20:48.

First round heats were held as follows:
Heat 1: 6th v 7th fastest
Heat 2: 5th v 8th fastest
Heat 3: 2nd v 3rd fastest
Heat 4: 1st v 4th fastest

The winners of heats three and four advanced to the gold medal race. The remaining six teams were ranked on time, from which the top two proceeded to the bronze medal race.

 QG = qualified for gold medal final
 QB = qualified for bronze medal final

Finals

The finals were started at 19:25.

References

Men's team pursuit
UCI Track Cycling World Championships – Men's team pursuit